Bahman Daroshafaei (Persian: بهمن دارالشفایی) is an Iranian-British journalist, translator, blogger and film maker. Daroshafaei is a former journalist of the BBC's Persian service.
Daroshafaei left BBC Persian at 2013 and returned to Iran. 
He had been working as a translator for Mahi Publishing Company and for an Iranian NGO.

In February 2016, Daroshafaei was arrested in Tehran- Iran, he was taken from his home by judiciary officers.

Works

Translation
 Political Philosophy: A Very Short Introduction - David Miller
Politics: A Very Short Introduction - Kenneth Minogue
Address Unknown - Kathrine Taylor
A Bear Called Paddington- Michael Bond
 Down and Out in Paris and London- George Orwell

Filmography 
 Farhad's Fridays, a documentary about Farhad Mehrad

References

Living people
Iranian journalists
Iranian translators
Iranian bloggers
Sharif University of Technology alumni
BBC newsreaders and journalists
Iranian documentary filmmakers
Year of birth missing (living people)
Iranian industrial engineers
21st-century translators